Shennong , variously translated as "Divine Farmer" or "Divine Husbandman", born Jiang Shinian, was a mythological Chinese ruler known as the first Yan Emperor who has become a deity in Chinese and Vietnamese folk religion. He is venerated as a culture hero in China and Vietnam. In Vietnamese he is referred to as Thần Nông.

Shennong has at times been counted amongst the Three Sovereigns (also known as "Three Kings" or "Three Patrons"), a group of ancient deities or deified kings of prehistoric China. Shennong has been thought to have taught the ancient Chinese not only their practices of agriculture, but also the use of herbal drugs. Shennong was credited with various inventions: these include the hoe, plow (both leisi style and the plowshare), axe, digging wells, agricultural irrigation, preserving stored seeds by using boiled horse urine, the weekly farmers market, the Chinese calendar (especially the division into the 24 jieqi or solar terms), and to have refined the therapeutic understanding of taking pulse measurements, acupuncture, and moxibustion, and to have instituted the harvest thanksgiving ceremony (zhaji(蜡祭) sacrificial rite, later known as the laji(腊祭) rite).

"Shennong" can also be taken to refer to his people, the Shennong-shi.

Mythology
In Chinese mythology, Shennong taught humans the use of the plow, aspects of basic agriculture, and the use of medicinal plants. Possibly influenced by the Yan Emperor mythos or the use of slash-and-burn agriculture, Shennong was a god of burning wind. He was also sometimes said to be a progenitor to, or to have had as one of his ministers, Chiyou (and like him, was ox-headed, sharp-horned, bronze-foreheaded, and iron-skulled). 

Shennong is also thought to be the father of the Huang Emperor who carried on the secrets of medicine, immortality, and making gold. According to the eighth century AD historian Sima Zhen's commentary to the second century BC Shiji (or, Records of the Grand Historian), Shennong is a kinsman of the Yellow Emperor and is said to be an ancestor, or a patriarch, of the ancient forebears of the Chinese.

In literature
Sima Qian mentioned that the rulers directly preceding the Yellow Emperor were of the house (or societal group) of Shennong. Sima Zhen, who added a prologue for the Records of the Grand Historian, said his surname was Jiang, and proceeded to list his successors.  An older and more famous reference is in the Huainanzi; it tells how, prior to Shennong, people were sickly, wanting, starved and diseased; but he then taught them agriculture, which he himself had researched, eating hundreds of plants — and even consuming seventy poisons in one day. Shennong also features in the book popularly known in English as I Ching. Here, he is referenced as coming to power after the end of the house (or reign) of Paoxi (Fu Xi), also inventing a bent-wood plow, a cut-wood rake, teaching these skills to others, and establishing a noonday market. Another reference is in the Lüshi Chunqiu, mentioning some violence with regard to the rise of the Shennong house, and that their power lasted seventeen generations.

The Shénnóng Běn Cǎo Jīng is a book on agriculture and medicinal plants, attributed to Shennong. Research suggests that it is a compilation of oral traditions, written between about 200 and 250 AD.

Historicity

Reliable information on the history of China before the 13th century BC can come only from archaeological evidence because China's first established written system on a durable medium, the oracle bone script, did not exist until then. Thus, the concrete existence of even the Xia dynasty, said to be the successor to Shennong, is yet to be proven, despite efforts by Chinese archaeologists to link that dynasty with Bronze Age Erlitou archaeological sites.

However, Shennong, both the individual and the clan, are very important in Chinese cultural history, especially in regards to mythology and popular culture. Indeed, Shennong figures extensively in historical literature.

Popular religion

According to some versions of the myths about Shennong, he eventually died as a result of his researches into the properties of plants by experimenting upon his own body, after, in one of his tests, he ate the yellow flower of a weed that caused his intestines to rupture before he had time to swallow his antidotal tea: having thus given his life for humanity, he has since received special honor through his worship as the Medicine King ( Yàowáng). The sacrifice of cows or oxen to Shennong in his various manifestations is never at all appropriate; instead pigs and sheep are acceptable. Fireworks and incense may also be used, especially at the appearance of his statue on his birthday, lunar April 26, according to popular tradition. Under his various names, Shennong is the patron deity of farmers, rice traders, and practitioners of traditional Chinese medicine. Many temples and other places dedicated to his commemoration exist.

Popular culture

As noted above, Shennong is said in the Huainanzi to have tasted hundreds of herbs to test their medical value. The most well-known work attributed to Shennong is The Divine Farmer's Herb-Root Classic, first compiled some time during the end of the Western Han Dynasty — several thousand years after Shennong might have existed. This work lists the various medicinal herbs, such as lingzhi, that were discovered by Shennong and given grade and rarity ratings. It is considered to be the earliest Chinese pharmacopoeia, and includes 365 medicines derived from minerals, plants, and animals. Shennong is credited with identifying hundreds of medical (and poisonous) herbs by personally testing their properties, which was crucial to the development of traditional Chinese medicine. Legend holds that Shennong had a transparent body, and thus could see the effects of different plants and herbs on himself. He is also said to have discovered tea, which he found it to be acting as an antidote against the poisonous effects of some seventy herbs he tested on his body. Shennong first tasted it, traditionally in ca. 2437 BC, from tea leaves on burning tea twigs, after they were carried up from the fire by the hot air, landing in his cauldron of boiling water. Shennong is venerated as the Father of Chinese medicine. He is also believed to have introduced the technique of acupuncture.

Shennong is said to have played a part in the creation of the guqin, together with Fuxi and the Yellow Emperor. Scholarly works mention that the paternal family of famous Song dynasty General Yue Fei traced their origins back to Shennong.

Places
Shennong is associated with certain geographic localities including Shennongjia, in Hubei, where the rattan ladder which he used to climb the local mountain range is supposed to have transformed into a vast forest. The Shennong Stream flows from here into the Yangtze River.

Gallery

See also 
 Yan Huang Zisun
 Phou Ningthou
 Shennong Stream
 Shilin Shennong Temple, Taiwan
 Three Sovereigns and Five Emperors
 Yan Emperor
 Yellow Emperor

References

Citations

Sources

External links 

 Statue of Shennong in ZhuZhou
 Variants on the nóng character.
 "Shen Nong and Tea" article from The Tea Site.

Three Sovereigns and Five Emperors
Agriculturalism
Chinese gods
Guqin players
History of ancient China
Health gods
Fire gods
Deities in Chinese folk religion
Vietnamese folk religion
Deified Chinese people
Yan Emperor